Old Kentuck is located in Marlboro Township, Monmouth County, New Jersey, United States. The house was built in 1770 and was added to the National Register of Historic Places on November 6, 1973. First recorded owner was Asher Holmes, a veteran of the American Revolutionary War.

See also
National Register of Historic Places listings in Monmouth County, New Jersey

References

Federal architecture in New Jersey
Marlboro Township, New Jersey
Houses completed in 1770
Houses in Monmouth County, New Jersey
Houses on the National Register of Historic Places in New Jersey
National Register of Historic Places in Monmouth County, New Jersey
New Jersey Register of Historic Places
1770 establishments in New Jersey